Lepidanthrax is a genus of bee flies in the family Bombyliidae. There are at least 50 described species in Lepidanthrax.

Species

Lepidanthrax actios Hall, 1976
Lepidanthrax agrestis (Coquillett, 1887)
Lepidanthrax albifrons Roberts, 1928
Lepidanthrax angulus Osten Sacken, 1886
Lepidanthrax arizonensis Hall, 1976
Lepidanthrax arnaudi Hall, 1976
Lepidanthrax borius Hall, 1976
Lepidanthrax californicus Hall, 1976
Lepidanthrax calyptus Hall, 1976
Lepidanthrax campestris (Coquillett, 1887)
Lepidanthrax capnopennis Hall, 1976
Lepidanthrax capopennis Hall, 1976
Lepidanthrax chalcus Hall, 1976
Lepidanthrax chloristus Hall, 1976
Lepidanthrax choristus Hall, 1976
Lepidanthrax chrysus Hall, 1976
Lepidanthrax coquilletti Evenhuis and Hall, 1999
Lepidanthrax diaeretus Hall, 1976
Lepidanthrax diamphus Hall, 1976
Lepidanthrax disjunctus (Wiedemann, 1830)
Lepidanthrax ellipus Hall, 1976
Lepidanthrax eremicus Hall, 1976
Lepidanthrax euthemus Hall, 1976
Lepidanthrax exallus Hall, 1976
Lepidanthrax fuscipennis Hall, 1976
Lepidanthrax hesperus Hall, 1976
Lepidanthrax homologus Hall, 1976
Lepidanthrax hyalinipennis Cole, 1923
Lepidanthrax hypomelus Hall, 1976
Lepidanthrax hyposcelus Hall, 1976
Lepidanthrax hyposelus Hall, 1976
Lepidanthrax indecisus Curran, 1930
Lepidanthrax lautus (Coquillett, 1887)
Lepidanthrax leucocephalus Hall, 1976
Lepidanthrax linguata Roberts, 1928
Lepidanthrax linsdalei Hall, 1976
Lepidanthrax litus Hall, 1976
Lepidanthrax lutzi Curran, 1930
Lepidanthrax meristus Hall, 1976
Lepidanthrax mimus Hall, 1976
Lepidanthrax morphnus Hall, 1976
Lepidanthrax morphrus Hall, 1976
Lepidanthrax oribates Hall, 1976
Lepidanthrax painterorum Hall, 1976
Lepidanthrax panamensis Curran, 1930
Lepidanthrax periphanus Hall, 1976
Lepidanthrax peristigus Hall, 1976
Lepidanthrax photinus Hall, 1976
Lepidanthrax proboscideus (Loew, 1869)
Lepidanthrax rauchi Hall, 1976
Lepidanthrax salvadorensis Hall, 1976
Lepidanthrax sonorensis Hall, 1976
Lepidanthrax stichus Hall, 1976
Lepidanthrax symmachus Hall, 1976
Lepidanthrax tinctus (Thomson, 1869)
Lepidanthrax utahensis Hall, 1976

References

Further reading

External links

 

Bombyliidae
Articles created by Qbugbot
Taxa named by Carl Robert Osten-Sacken
Bombyliidae genera